Sean Crighton (born 26 March 1990) is a Scottish footballer and coach who plays as a central defender, and is currently a player for Stenhousemuir. Crighton began his career with St Mirren, and has also played for Montrose, Elgin City, Greenock Morton, Airdrieonians, Livingston and Brechin City. During his playing time at Stenhousemuir, Crighton would perform the role of caretaker manager.

Playing career
Crighton began his career as a youth player with Scottish Premier League club St Mirren, spending a season on loan with Montrose before moving permanently to the club in June 2009.

After three years and almost 100 appearances, Crighton left Montrose to sign a two-year contract with Elgin City in 2012, spending two seasons with the side before being released at the end of the 2013–14 season.

Crighton subsequently signed for hometown club Greenock Morton in June 2014, helping the club win Scottish League One. Crighton was released by Morton shortly after the league win, moving east to sign with Airdrieonians after just a month without a club.

After his spell with the Diamonds, he signed for a season with Livingston where he captained the club to the League One title, before joining newly promoted Scottish Championship side Brechin City in July 2017. Crighton left Brechin at the end of the 2017–18 season.

On 3 May 2018, Crighton agreed a deal to return for a second spell at Airdrieonians, remaining with the club until May 2021. He then signed for Stenhousemuir.

Coaching career
In April 2018, Crighton was promoted to head of the academy pathway at Greenock Morton. He left his role in August 2019, to take up coaching positions with the Airdrieonians first team and the Hamilton Academical youth academy.

After the departure of manager Stephen Swift, Crighton was named as caretaker manager of Stenhousemuir on 7 December 2022. He would perform the role until the appointment of Gary Naysmith as manager on 3 January 2023.

Career total

Honours

Morton
Scottish League One: 2014–15

Livingston
Scottish League One: 2016–17

References

External links

1990 births
Living people
Footballers from Greenock
Scottish footballers
Association football defenders
St Mirren F.C. players
Montrose F.C. players
Elgin City F.C. players
Greenock Morton F.C. players
Airdrieonians F.C. players
Livingston F.C. players
Brechin City F.C. players
Scottish Football League players
Scottish Professional Football League players
Greenock Morton F.C. non-playing staff
Hamilton Academical F.C. non-playing staff
Stenhousemuir F.C. players
Association football coaches
Stenhousemuir F.C. managers
Scottish Professional Football League managers